David Pimentel (born 1927), Mexican weightlifter.

David Pimentel may also refer to:

David Pimentel (scientist) (1925–2019), American professor
David Dias Pimentel (1941–2021), Portuguese bishop